Mirza Isa Farahani, commonly known as Mirza Bozorg Qa'em-Maqam (also spelled Qa'em-Maqam I; died 1820/1), was an Iranian official, who played a leading role in the politics of early 19th-century Qajar Iran. He was the father of the distinguished politician and writer Abol-Qasem Qa'em-Maqam (died 1835).

References

Sources 
 
 
 
 
 
 
 
 
 
 
 

18th-century births
1820s deaths
19th-century Iranian politicians
18th-century Iranian politicians
People of Qajar Iran